Separadas is an Argentine telenovela produced by Pol-ka Producciones that premiered on 20 January 2020 on El Trece, and was ended abruptly on 19 March 2020. The series revolves around seven women who are affected, to different degrees, by a real estate fraud that plunges them into a deep crisis and leaves them on the brink of the abyss, and it stars an ensemble cast headed by Agustina Cherri, Celeste Cid, Marcela Kloosterboer, Mónica Antonópulos, Julieta Zylberberg, Gimena Accardi, Julieta Nair Calvo, along to Sebastián Estevanez, Maxi Iglesias, Ludovico Di Santo, Victorio D'Alessandro, Andrés Gil, Iair Said, Paula Grinszpan, and Viviana Saccone.

On 16 March 2020, El Trece confirmed that the telenovela would go off the air indefinitely, this following an order issued by the Argentine Association of Actors, due to the COVID-19 pandemic in Argentina, since the telenovela was still in the production process. On 12 May 2020, it was confirmed that the show was canceled and would not resume production.

Cast

Main 
 Agustina Cherri as Romina Baldi
 Mariano Martinez as Diego
 Marcela Kloosterboer as Luján Alcorta
 Celeste Cid as Martina Rivero
 Mónica Antonópulos as Clara Rivero
 Julieta Zylberberg as Paula Kaplan
 Gimena Accardi as Carolina Fernández
 Julieta Nair Calvo as Inés Fernández
 Sebastián Estevanez as Miguel Cardozo
 Maxi Iglesias as Felipe Iriarte / Francisco Azcurra
 Ludovico Di Santo as Pedro Moret
 Victorio D'Alessandro as Nicolás Alonso
 Andrés Gil as Andrés Saavedra
 Iair Said as Gabriel Morales
 Paula Grinszpan as Natalia
 Viviana Saccone as Renata Soria

Recurring 
 Fabio Di Tomaso as Matias Santamaría
 Marco Antonio Caponi as Fausto Valdéz
 Laura Azcurra as Victoria Lorca
 Laura Laprida as Lena
 Tomás Benítez as Benicio Valdéz Rivero
 Nicolás Lorenzón as Sebastián Valdéz Rivero
 Connie Ballarini as Magui
 Mariano Saborido as Facundo
 Azul Araya as Roma Santamaría Kaplan
 Bruno Pedicone as Maxi
 Rodrigo Raffetto as Julian
 Clara Corrado as Camila Paloma Cardozo
 Gustavo Conti as Antonio
 Olivia Martínez as Micaela Osorio Lorca
 Romina Giardina as Vanesa
 Stephanie Petresky as Juana Vázquez
 Sofía Elliot as Lola
 Nicolás Pauls as David Cruciani
 Edgardo Moreira as Vega
 Pablo Seijo as Riccardi
 Reina Reech as Eva Alcorta
 Darío Barassi as Fabio
 Agustín Sierra as Franco
 Carla Quevedo as Emilia

References 

2020 telenovelas
El Trece telenovelas
Spanish-language telenovelas
Spanish-language television shows
Television series about families
Argentine telenovelas
Television productions cancelled due to the COVID-19 pandemic
2020 Argentine television series debuts